Kənzə or Gənzə or Genzya or Kyanza or Genze may refer to:
Kaw people
Kənzə, Ismailli, Azerbaijan
Gənzə, Nakhchivan, Azerbaijan
GenZe (company)